Timothy P. Misny is an American personal injury lawyer who specializes in birth injury, medical malpractice, pharmaceutical class action lawsuits, catastrophic injury and wrongful death. Misny has been practicing law in Greater Cleveland for over 32 years and is known locally for his weekly television show on Cleveland CBS affiliate WOIO and his television commercials carrying his trademarked phrase "I'll Make Them Pay."

Early life and career
Misny was born in the Cleveland suburb of Euclid on April 22, 1955.  He is a third generation Slovak American. His paternal grandfather, Janos Mizanyin, changed his surname to Misny after immigrating to the United States from Slovakia (at the time, part of Austria-Hungary). Misny's maternal grandfather, Joseph Vulich, was a Croatian immigrant construction worker who died when scaffolding collapsed during the construction of Tower City Center in Cleveland in the late 1920s.

Misny has told interviewers that when he was seven years old, his maternal grandmother, Vernica Vulich, took him to downtown Cleveland to see the Tower City Center. When he asked who lived in the building, she told him lawyers rented offices in the building, and that through hard study he would also one day be a lawyer. On his website, Misny cites his family history as inspiration for his work as a personal injury lawyer.

In his childhood, Misny attended St. Paul Elementary School and graduated from St. Joseph High School in 1973. He received his undergraduate degree in pre-law from John Carroll University in 1977, and earned his J.D. degree from Cleveland–Marshall College of Law in 1981.

Misny served as an assistant police prosecutor and as an attorney of the Cleveland Police Patrolmen's Association before becoming a plaintiff personal injury lawyer. Misny represents clients from across the United States.

Personal life
Timothy Misny married Stephanie Paulitsch in Rome, Italy, on June 23, 2007. Their son Maximilian Aldrovandi Misny was born on December 13, 2009. The family currently lives at their 55-acre woodland estate, "Misnyland," in the Cleveland suburb of Waite Hill. Misny also supports and helps raise funds for the Cleveland City Mission.

Notes

References
 Baker, Brandon (January 18, 2010). "Many sides of Misny." The News-Herald (Cleveland).
 Crump, Sarah (November 13, 2010). "Tough Cleveland lawyer Tim Misny has a soft side". The Plain Dealer (Cleveland).
 Shingler, Dan (November 1, 2010). "The story behind 'I'll make them pay!'". Crain's Cleveland Business (Cleveland).

External links
 

Lawyers from Cleveland
Ohio lawyers
Living people
Year of birth missing (living people)